The Democratic Party of Korea held a leadership election on 29 August 2020. It was the second leadership election since the inauguration of President Moon Jae-in. Although elected leader serves for the fixed two-year term, newly elected leader Lee Nak-yon is unlikely to serve for two years due to his presumptive presidential campaign in 2022.

Background

Landslide victory of 2020 General Election 
In 2020 South Korean General Election, The Democrats, led by Lee Hae-chan, won the majority in the National Assembly by landslide. The Democratic Party and its affiliate Party, Platform Party, won 180 seats (60%) in 300-seat Assembly. It was the biggest majority since the democratization of South Korea after the June Struggle in 1987. It was an endorsement of President Moon Jae-in's COVID-19 response that got a good reputation worldwide.

Coronavirus 
Due to the continued impact of COVID-19 pandemic, the Democratic Party National Convention Preparatory Committee decided to hold a national convention online to elect its leadership. The Democratic Party originally planned an event in Jamsil Olympic Stadium in which about 600 members of the Central Committee attended, but it changed to online event due to concerns about second wave of COVID-19. Eventually, the party decided to allow only about 50 candidates and staffs at the Democratic Party's headquarter and broadcast the results of the election and the acceptance speech on the Internet on 29 August 2020.

Candidates

Candidates for leader

Nominated

Candidates for Supreme Council

Nominated

Eliminated 

In the election of the Supreme Council, 10 people were running, so the party have to eliminate 2 candidates and held the final election with the remaining 8 candidates according to the rules. On 24 July 2020, the Democratic Party held a caucus for the election of the party's Supreme Council by on-site and online voting. About 660 members of the Central Committee participated in the vote. As a result of the vote, Lee Won-wook, Noh Woong-rae, Kim Jong-min, So Byeong-hoon, Shin Dong-kun, Han Byung-do, Yang Hyang-ja, and Yeom Tae-yeong were nominated. However, The ranking and number of votes for each candidate were not released. Of the eight nominated candidates, five are finally elected through elections held at the National Assembly on August 29. In addition, under the party's rule, at least one elected member of the Supreme Council shall be women. Yang Hyang-ja was the only remaining female candidate, so she was virtually elected as the Supreme Council member.

Those who announced that they will not run for this election 

 Hong Young-pyo, former floor leader of the party and member of National Assembly
 Song Young-gil, former mayor of Incheon and member of National Assembly 
 Woo Won-shik, former floor leader of the party and member of National Assembly

Debates

Televised debates

Results 

The ratio of the results by sector was 45% for delegates, 40% for party members, 10% for opinion poll and 5% for non-voting members poll.

References 

Minjoo Party of Korea
Political party leadership elections in South Korea
2020 in South Korea
Democratic Party of Korea leadership election